Landfill Harmonic (stylized as landillharmonic) is a 2015 documentary film directed by Brad Allgood and Graham Townsley. It stars and tells the story of Paraguayan music teacher Favio Chavez and his Recycled Orchestra of Cateura, a children's orchestra in Paraguay which performs with materials recycled from a trash landfill near Asunción. According to The Huffington Post, "[t]he film is both an exposé on the harsh conditions of slum life and a commentary on the global threats of consumption and waste".

Overview
The film details the founding and development of the Recycled Orchestra of Cateura.  

When Luis Szarán and Favio Chavez came to Cateura, a landfill located in Asunción, Paraguay, to start a music school, they realized that they had more students than instruments. Thanks to the resourcefulness of Cola, a Cateurian garbage picker, an orchestra came together, now featuring violins, cellos, and other instruments artfully put together from trash. Now known as the Recycled Orchestra of Cateura, the orchestra soon became independent. In 2012 it performed in Brazil and Colombia under Chavez's direction.

Release 
The film debuted on March 18, 2015. In the United States, the film is shown on HBO.

Reception
Ken Jaworoski of The New York Times gave the felt the film was "an inspiring tale" and the children involved in it were "wonderful to watch", though he criticized the interview style.
John DeFore of The Hollywood Reporter called it "[a]n unlikely breakthrough story whose happy endings come with asterisks".

This film was shortlisted for the Environmental Award at the 2015 Sheffield Doc/Fest documentary festival, where it won a special mention.

Awards 
 2015 Winner, Audience Award – “24 Beats Per Second”, South By Southwest Film Festival 
 2015 Winner,  The Moving Mountains Prize (third place), Telluride Mountainfilm Festival
 2015 Winner,  Runner Up Audience Award for Best Feature Film, Illuminate Film Festival 2015
 2015 Winner,  Audience Award and Inspiring Lives Award, San Francisco Green Film Festival 2015
 2015 Winner,  Family Friendly feature Award, Maui Film Festival 2015
 2015 Special Mention, Environmental category, Sheffield Doc Festival 2015
 2015 winner, VIFF Impact: International Audience Award, Vancouver International Film Festival

References

External links 
 
 
 Official site of Recycled Orchestra
 Official site of Sounds of the Earth
 Official site of NGO geAm
 Official site of NGO Alter Vida
 Official blog of Procicla
 Official site of Empo Ltda. y Asociados

2015 films
2015 documentary films
American musical films
Films set in Paraguay
2010s Spanish-language films
Paraguayan documentary films
Documentary films about music and musicians
American documentary films
2010s American films